The 2020 U Sports Men's Final 8 Basketball Tournament was held March 6–8, 2020, in Ottawa, Ontario. It was jointly hosted by Carleton University, the University of Ottawa, and the Ottawa Sports & Entertainment Group (OSEG) at TD Place Arena. It was held in conjunction with the 2020 U Sports Women's Basketball Championship which occurred on the same weekend. This was the fifth time the city of Ottawa hosted the Men's championship game.

The Carleton Ravens won its 15th national title, and the gold medal, beating the Dalhousie Tigers in the championship game. The UBC Thunderbirds took the bronze medal over the Western Mustangs. This was the last college basketball championship event to be held in North America before the declaration of the COVID-19 pandemic; the 2020 NCAA Division I men's basketball tournament would be cancelled four days after Carleton won the tournament.

Participating teams

Championship Bracket

Consolation Bracket

See also 
2020 U Sports Women's Basketball Championship

References

External links 
 Tournament Web Site

2019–20 in Canadian basketball
Carleton University
U Sports Men's Basketball Championship
University of Ottawa
Sports competitions in Ottawa